Jack T. Knuepfer (November 16, 1920 – September 13, 2006) was an American businessman and politician.

Born in Chicago, Illinois, Knuepfer went to Oak Park High School. During World War II, he served in the United States Army; prior to the United States entering World War II, Knuepfer was an ambulance driver for the British Army. Knuepfer went to Carlton College and received his master's degree in business from University of Chicago. He worked for his family's machine tool business: General Engineering Works in Elmhurst, Illinois.

He served on the Elmhurst City Council. Then, in 1965, Knuepner served in the Illinois House of Representatives and was a Republican. From 1967 to 1975, Knuepfer served in the Illinois State Senate. From 1978 to 1990, Knuepfer served as chairman of the DuPage County, Illinois Board of Commissioners. Knuepfer died at Elmhurst Memorial Hospital in Elmhurst, Illinois.

A through arch bridge that spans the Canadian National Railway tracks in West Chicago, Illinois is named after Knuepfer. The bridge is part of the Illinois Prairie Path and was completed in 1990. It won the American Institute of Steel Construction Prize Bridge Competition Award of Merit.

Notes

1920 births
2006 deaths
Politicians from Chicago
People from Elmhurst, Illinois
Carleton College alumni
University of Chicago alumni
Businesspeople from Illinois
County executives in Illinois
County commissioners in Illinois
Illinois city council members
Republican Party members of the Illinois House of Representatives
Republican Party Illinois state senators
20th-century American politicians
20th-century American businesspeople
United States Army personnel of World War II